Ana Maria Narti, born 1936 in Bucharest, Romania is a Swedish writer and politician.

Life
Narti was born with a Russian mother and a Romanian father from Macedonia.

In 1970, Narti fled to Sweden as a refugee where she received political asylum.

In 2019, she supported Erik Ullenhag, with the Liberal Party. When he was not elected, Narti, in turn, chose to left the party.

References

External links
Ana Maria Narti at the Riksdag website

1936 births
21st-century Swedish women politicians
Living people
Members of the Riksdag 1998–2002
Members of the Riksdag 2002–2006
Members of the Riksdag from the Liberals (Sweden)
Romanian emigrants to Sweden
Romanian refugees
Women members of the Riksdag